Bronwyn Hughes Hall is the Emerita Professor of Economics at the University of California at Berkeley.

Education
Hall received a B.A. in Physics from Wellesley College in 1966 and a Ph.D. in economics from Stanford University in 1988.

Career
She was professor of economics of technology and innovation at Maastricht University between 2005 and 2015. Hall founded TSP International, an econometric software firm, from which she has severed ties.

Hall is a research associate of the National Bureau of Economic Research and the Institute for Fiscal Studies. She is also a visiting fellow at the National Institute of Economic and Social Research.

Bibliography

References

External links
 Faculty page
 
 Profile on IDEAS/RePEc
 Profile on Academia.edu

Innovation economists
American economists
American women economists
American social scientists
Wellesley College alumni
Stanford University alumni
University of California, Berkeley College of Letters and Science faculty
Living people
Year of birth missing (living people)
21st-century American women